There are a large number of expatriates in Kuwait, with most residing in the capital of Kuwait City. Expatriates are primarily attracted by the employment opportunities in Kuwait. Kuwaiti nationals account for 31% of Kuwait's total population.

Middle Eastern populations (Arab world)

Egyptians
Egyptians are the second largest expat community in Kuwait, numbering more than 666,000 workers (December 2020).

Palestinians
There are 70,000 Palestinian expats in Kuwait.

Saudis
540,773 Saudi Arabian nationals live in Kuwait. Both Kuwait and Saudi Arabia are neighbours and part of the Gulf Cooperation Council, which means that the citizens of each GCC member can live and work in any of the six countries without a visa and other restrictions.

Syrians

There are around 161,000 Syrian expats in Kuwait. Syrians were among the first educated work force in Kuwait, the first Syrian expats immigrated to Kuwait in the 1960s.

West Asian populations (Non-Arabs)

Armenians

The Armenian population reached its peak of 12,000. But after the Iraqi invasions, the numbers of the Armenians resident in Kuwait greatly diminished to just 500 as they left the country.

Iranians

In 2012, there were 45,000 Iranian expats according to the population census. Iranians are heavily concentrated in the Bneid al-Gar suburb of Kuwait City. Most Iranians are employed in the private sector. In 2011, there were 42,795 Iranians in Kuwait; 699 were employed in the public sector, 24,684 in the private sector and 16,577 were on dependent visas.

There are Iranian schools in Kuwait, all privately funded and located in the suburbs of Kuwait City, for example the Iranian School of Kuwait.

Turks

There are 4,000 Turkish expats in Kuwait.  Most Turks work as barbers, engineers, businessmen and doctors.

South Asian populations

Indians

The Indian community in Kuwait includes Indian expats (mostly hailing from the southern states of Kerala and Tamil Nadu), as well as Kuwaiti citizens of Indian origin. According to the Indian ministry of external affairs, there are around 1,020,000 Indians as on 31 December 2020, constituting the largest expatriate community in Kuwait.

There are 17 Indian schools in Kuwait affiliated to the Central Board of Secondary Education (CBSE). There were 164 Indian community Associations earlier registered with the Indian Embassy of Kuwait. Following introduction of a re-registration requirement, 106 of these Indian community Associations have once again registered with the Embassy and the number of registered Associations is growing at a steady pace.

Pakistanis

The population of Pakistanis in Kuwait is around 100,000 (December 2020). The former Pakistani chargé d'affaires in Kuwait has given a higher estimate of 150,000 in 2009. There are many Pakistani schools in Kuwait.

Sri Lankans
There are 99,858 Sri Lankans living and working in Kuwait in 2016.

East and Southeast Asian populations

Filipinos

There are roughly 241,000 (as of December 2020) Filipinos in Kuwait. Most are migrant workers, and approximately 60% of Filipinos in Kuwait are employed as domestic workers.

In 2011, Kuwait was the sixth-largest destination of Overseas Filipino Workers, with 65,000 hired or rehired in the nation in 2011, and accordingly Kuwait has been an important source of remittances back to the Philippines, with over $105 million USD being remitted in 2009. Nine Filipino banks have correspondent accounts with banks in Kuwait to allow for remittance transfers.

There is a Filipino Worker's Resource Center (FWRC) located in Jabriya, and it provides refuge for Filipino workers in Kuwait who have "[experienced] various forms of maltreatment from their employers such as fatigue, non-payment of salaries," as well as "lack of food [and] physical, verbal and sexual abuse". Through assistance from the FWRC, the Philippine Embassy in Kuwait, the Philippine Overseas Employment Administration, and Overseas Workers' Welfare Administration, hundreds of Filipinos in Kuwait have been repatriated to the Philippines due to these issues.

Kuwait had the largest number of voters registered under the Overseas Absentee Voting Act eligible to vote in the 2013 Philippine general election.

Indonesians
28,954 Indonesians reside in Kuwait as of 2020.

South and North Koreans

Koreans in Kuwait first arrived in 1975 as employees of South Korean construction companies, although the two countries did not establish formal relations until June 1979. By this time, Kuwait had already become the second-most popular Middle Eastern destination for Korean workers behind Saudi Arabia; by that time, 13,813 Korean workers had already come to Kuwait. However, Kuwait would soon lose the second-place position, being surpassed by Libya in 1981 and Iraq in 1982. Koreans in Kuwait generally did not receive a welcome from or assimilate to the local society; in common with Indians, Filipinos, and Pakistanis, they were described as being at the bottom of the social structure, "ridiculed and stripped of their rights". Nor did they spend much of their money locally; as meals and housing were provided for them in their work camps, it was estimated that they remitted 80% of their earnings back to South Korea. In spite of these difficulties, between 1975 and 1985, 63,898 South Korean workers came to Kuwait, and as late as 1990, roughly 10,000 were estimated to remain. Kuwait's only school for Korean nationals, the Kuwait Hangul School, was established in 1991. There were no known former South Korean nationals with Kuwaiti nationality; six were international students, and the remainder had other kinds of visas.

There was formerly a small contingent of South Korean soldiers in Kuwait, who numbered 170. South Korean civilian employees from the United States Army's Camp Casey in Dongducheon, Gyeonggi-do have been deployed to bases in Kuwait, including Camp Arifjan, in support of the US Army. In 2005, a group calling itself Kuwait Mujahideen claimed to have killed a Korean national as part of an attack on a US Army base in Umm Al-Hayman near Al Ahmadi.

North Korean companies have established a greater presence in Kuwait recent years, and the government of South Korea estimated that there are roughly three or four thousand North Korean construction workers in the country . Air Koryo, the national airline of North Korea, began operating weekly flights between Pyongyang and Kuwait City in 2011.

Western world populations

Americans
About 8,000 United States nationals live in Kuwait.

Britons
British people in Kuwait number 7,100 in 2006. Kuwait was occupied by the United Kingdom until 1961.

See also
Demographics of Kuwait

References

Works cited
 
 
 
 

 
 

 
 
Kuwait